Kutschin Peak is a prominent peak,  high, on the west slope of the Nilsen Plateau, standing  south of Mount Kristensen, at the east side of Amundsen Glacier, in the Queen Maud Mountains of Antarctica. It was named by the Advisory Committee on Antarctic Names for A. Kutschin, a member of the sea party of Amundsen's South Pole expedition of 1910–12.

References

Mountains of the Ross Dependency
Amundsen Coast